Challapeta is a village panchayat in Mentada mandal of Vizianagaram district, Andhra Pradesh, India. It is located about 29 km from Vizianagaram city. There is a Zilla Parishad High School in the village. There is a post office at Challapeta. PIN code is 535 581.

Demographics
 Indian census, the demographic details of Challapeta village is as follows:
 Total Population: 	1,928 in 428 Households
 Male Population: 	950 and Female Population: 	978
 Children Under 6-years of age: 	247 (Boys - 	118 and Girls -	129)
 Total Literates: 	755

References

Villages in Vizianagaram district